Juan Jesús Trapero Hidalgo  (born 21 December 1969 in Santander) is a former Spanish sprinter who competed in the men's 100m competition at the 1992 Summer Olympics. He recorded a 10.64, not enough to qualify for the next round past the heats. His personal best is 10.35, set in 1992. He also ran a leg for the Spanish 4 × 100 m relay team, which advanced to the semifinals with a time of 39.60, but did not advance further, posting a 39.62 in the semis.

References

1969 births
Living people
Spanish male sprinters
Athletes (track and field) at the 1992 Summer Olympics
Olympic athletes of Spain
Mediterranean Games silver medalists for Spain
Mediterranean Games medalists in athletics
Athletes (track and field) at the 1991 Mediterranean Games